José María Setién Alberro (18 March 1928 – 10 July 2018) was a Spanish Catholic prelate. He was auxiliary bishop of San Sebastián between 1972 and 1979, and bishop between 1979 and 2000.

Career
After the murder of the socialist Enrique Casas by ETA, María Setién prohibited having the funeral at the cathedral of San Sebastian. During the 1998 truce, he stated that the Constitution of Spain must have the self-determination of the Basque people. In the same year he offered himself to intercede for the politician prisoners. John Paul II expressed to the Episcopal Conference of Spain he doesn't like it. Finally, the Holy See interceded on it in 2009 and he renounced for health problems.

In 2007 he published Un obispo vasco ante ETA. In 2003 he was awarded the Gold Medal of Guipúzcoa.

He died on 10 July 2018 after suffering a stroke at age 90.

References

1928 births
2018 deaths
People from Hernani
20th-century Roman Catholic bishops in Spain
Academic staff of the University of Salamanca